A parasitic twin, also known as an asymmetrical twin or unequal conjoined twin, occurs when a twin embryo begins developing in utero, but the pair does not fully separate, and one embryo maintains dominant development at the expense of the other. It results from the same processes that also produces vanishing twins and conjoined twins, and may represent a continuum between the two. In parasitic twins, one ceases development during gestation and is vestigial to a mostly fully formed, otherwise healthy individual twin. The undeveloped twin is termed as parasitic, because it is incompletely formed or wholly dependent on the body functions of the complete fetus. The independent twin is called the autosite.

Variants

 Conjoined parasitic twins joined at the head are described as craniopagus or cephalopagus, and occipitalis if joined in the occipital region or parietalis if joined in the parietal region.
 Craniopagus parasiticus is a general term for a parasitic head attached to the head of a more fully developed fetus or infant.
 Fetus in fetu sometimes is interpreted as a special case of parasitic twin, but may be a distinct entity.
 The twin reversed arterial perfusion, or T.R.A.P. sequence, results in an 'acardiac twin', a parasitic twin that fails to develop a head, arms and a heart. The parasitic twin, little more than a torso with or without legs, receives its blood supply from the host twin by means of an umbilical cord-like structure, much like a fetus in fetu, except the acardiac twin is outside the autosite's body. The blood received by the parasitic twin has already been used by the normal fetus, and as such is already de-oxygenated, leaving little developmental nutrients for the acardiac twin. Because it is pumping blood for both itself and its acardiac twin, this causes extreme stress on the normal fetus' heart. Many T.R.A.P. pregnancies result in heart failure for the healthy twin. This twinning condition usually occurs very early in pregnancy. A rare variant of the acardiac fetus is the acardius acormus where the head is well developed but the heart and the rest of the body are rudimentary. While it is thought that the classical T.R.A.P./Acardius sequence is due to a retrograde flow from the umbilical arteries of the pump twin to the iliac arteries of the acardiac twin resulting in preferential caudal perfusion, acardius acormus is thought to be a result of an early embryopathy.

Images of parasitic twins

Human

Animals

See also
 Dipygus
 Frank Lentini
 Lakshmi Tatma
 Lazarus and Joannes Baptista Colloredo
 Rudy Santos
 Vestigial twin

References

Further reading
 

 
Congenital disorders
Rare diseases